Agra has a north-south broad gauge line intersecting an east-west broad gauge line. The crossing is around the Rui Ki Mandi area where the east west line passes under the North South line.

Two broad gauge lines come from Bharatpur and Bayana respectively. Both of these lines are single and electrified. These two lines converge just before Idgah Jn. and the common line continues up to Tundla Jn on Delhi - Howrah line.

Railway Stations
Agra railway stations are:

In Agra
 Agra Cantt - North Central Railways 
 Raja ki Mandi - North Central Railways
 Agra Fort - North Central Railways
 Agra City - North Central Railways
 Idgah - North Central Railways
 Yamuna Bridge - North Central Railways
 Etmadpur - North Central Railways
Kuberpur Railway Station
 Billochpura - North Central Railways
 Patholi - North Central Railways

Near Agra
 Tundla - 22 km from Agra.
 Mathura Junction - 50 km from Agra.
 Achhnera Junction - 27 km from Agra.

Arriving
Agra is well connected to most of the major cities in India.

Towards Maharashtra and Madhya pradesh 
There are direct trains between Agra and Mumbai, but all of them take around 24 hours. It is much better to take August Kranti Rajdhani Express or the Garib Rath which take only around 16 hours from Mathura, which is one hour's drive from Agra.

Towards Kolkata and North East
There are direct trains from Agra Fort Railway Station to Kolkata, most of them pass through Tundla Junction, which is a 40-minute drive from Agra.

Towards Rajasthan
There are many trains which go to Jaipur and further westwards in Rajasthan. Most of them go via Bayana and Bharatpur.

References

External links
 http://www.irfca.org/gallery/Trips/north/AgraTrip/

Transport in Agra
Agra railway division
North Central Railway zone
Rail transport in Uttar Pradesh